Köprübaşı is a village in the Sason District, Batman Province, Turkey. The village is populated by Kurds of the Timok tribe and had a population of 163 in 2021.

References

Villages in Sason District

Kurdish settlements in Batman Province